The State Anthem of the Republic of North Ossetia–Alania, a federal subject of Russia, was adopted by the Parliament of the Republic of North Ossetia–Alania on 24 November 1994.

Lyrics

Lyrics by Felix Tsarikati

See also
National Anthem of South Ossetia

Notes

References

North Ossetia - Alania
Regional songs
Ossetian songs
Ossetian-language songs
Culture of North Ossetia–Alania
National anthem compositions in G major
National anthem compositions in A major